Jonker Sailplanes is a glider manufacturer based in Potchefstroom, South Africa.

History
Uys Jonker and his brother, Attie Jonker founded Jonker Sailplanes in 2004.

Products
The following aircraft are in production or under development
 Jonker JS-1 Revelation 18m/21m flapped sailplane with jet sustainer - 2006
 Jonker JS-2 Revenant 18m/21m flapped self-launcher
 Jonker JS-3 Rapture 15m/18m flapped with jet sustainer or electric propulsion
 Jonker JS-4 Rengeti 15m/18m standard class sailplane with jet sustainer or electric propulsion
 Jonker JS-5 Rey Open class sailplane with jet sustainer or self-launcher

References

External links
Company website

Aircraft manufacturers of South Africa
Economy of North West (South African province)
Potchefstroom
Glider manufacturers